Bernardino López de Carvajal (8 September 1456, in Plasencia, Extremadura – 16 December 1523, in Rome) was a Spanish Cardinal.

He was a nephew of Cardinal Juan Carvajal, and advanced rapidly in the ecclesiastical career at Rome, whither he came during the pontificate of Pope Sixtus IV (1471–84). Under Pope Innocent VIII he held successively the Spanish sees of Astorga (1488), Badajoz (1489), and Cartagena, in which latter quality he was sent as nuncio to Spain. Their Catholic Majesties sent him back as Spanish ambassador to Pope Alexander VI, by whom he was made Cardinal of Sts. Peter and Marcellinus in 1493, which title he exchanged in 1495 for that of Santa Croce in Gerusalemme. 

In the next following years he was sent twice as legate to the German imperial court, also to Naples, and acted as Governor of Campania. In 1503 he was made Bishop of Siguenza in Spain, and Administrator of the diocese of Avellino; from 1507 to 1509 he was in turn Cardinal-Bishop of Albano, Bishop of Frascati, Bishop of Palestrina and Bishop of Sabina.

In spite of this rapid advancement and his numerous benefices he is best remembered as the leading spirit of the schismatical Council of Pisa (1511), which he organized with the aid of four other cardinals (Cardinal Briçonnet, Cardinal Francesco Borgia, Cardinal Federico Sanseverino, and Cardinal René de Prie). Dissatisfaction with his treatment by Pope Julius II, and subserviency to the excommunicate Louis XII of France, led Carvajal to this rebellious attitude.

Moroni (Diz., X, 134) says that he went so far as to accept the office of Antipope Martin VI at Milan whither the Council was soon transferred. Von Reumont says that in Pisa he was known to the urchins of the street as "Papa Bernardino".

It would seem, therefore, that ambition was his chief falling; otherwise he was reputed a good theologian and a friend of art and letters, virtuous, eloquent, and skilful in the business of the curia. Both Carvajal and his colleagues were excommunicated by Julius II, and deposed from their offices, which act of the pope was confirmed by the Fifth Lateran Council (1512). At the seventh session (1513) of this council the Italian cardinals, Carvajal and Sanseverino, separated from their two French colleagues, formally renounced the schism, and were restored by Pope Leo X to their offices.

Carvajal was later made Cardinal-Bishop of Ostia and Dean of the Sacred College, with his uncle's former title of San Marcello, and as such welcomed to Rome Pope Adrian VI, whom he survived, and Pope Clement VII. He had lived at Rome under eight popes, and was buried in his titular church of Santa Croce, where a magnificent sepulchral monument perpetuates his memory.

The noble but modernized frescoes (Pinturicchio school) in the tribuna of the apse, representing the Discovery of the Holy Cross, are owing to his generosity.

References

External links
 

 

1456 births
1523 deaths
15th-century Roman Catholic bishops in Castile
16th-century Roman Catholic bishops in Spain
Bishops of Astorga
Bishops of Avellino
Bishops of Badajoz
Bishops of Cartagena
Bishops of Sigüenza
Cardinal-bishops of Albano
Cardinal-bishops of Frascati
Cardinal-bishops of Ostia
Cardinal-bishops of Palestrina
Cardinal-bishops of Sabina
Deans of the College of Cardinals
People from Plasencia
People temporarily excommunicated by the Catholic Church
16th-century Spanish cardinals
University of Salamanca alumni
Academic staff of the University of Salamanca
Latin Patriarchs of Jerusalem
15th-century Spanish diplomats
16th-century Spanish diplomats